Jonai is a Sub-Division of Dhemaji District in the state of Assam in India.

Etymology
The name Jonai is derived from the name of a Chutia princess named Jona who was married off to a Kachari prince named Kansan. 
As per folklore, the Kachari prince had entered the Chutia kingdom along with 900 men as he had left his kingdom due to some personal issues. The Chutia princess having heard about this encroachment ordered her soldiers to make the prince and his followers captive and to bring them to the royal court in Sadiya. Later, as events turned out, the princess fell in love with the prince, and she was married off to him and they settled in Jonai. The other followers too married local women.
The Sonowal Kacharis are thought to be descendants of this group of people and recall the queen as Jonadoi Ai.

Demographics 
Jonai is the easternmost sub-division of Dhemaji District, about 554 km from the state capital, Guwahati. It is located at 27.83°N, 95.22°E. Covering a total Geographical area of 1111.81 km2, it is bounded by Arunachal Pradesh in the north, Lali & Brahmaputra River in the south, Sipiya river & Sadiya Subdivision of Tinsukia district in the east and Simen River in the west. The headquarters is at 95.160 E and 27.770 N. The Sub-division comprises with one Development Block named by Murkong Selek Tribal Development Block, One Revenue Circle named by Jonai Revenue Circle and 15 Nos. of Gaon Panchayats. According to 2001 census, the population of Jonai is 143,199. Jonai has a literacy rate of 64.9% according to the census 2001. But currently it has literacy rate above the national level.

Governance 
Jonai is part of Lakhimpur (Lok Sabha constituency).
Jonai is a Vidhan Sabha Constituency. It has its own Member of Legislative Assembly (MLA) which is a reserved seat for Schedule Tribe quota. Jonai comes under the Mishing Autonomous Council (MAC) area. The most popular political parties are Indian National Congress (INC), Sanmilita Ganasakthi Asom (SGSA), Bharatiya Janata Party (BJP), Asom Gana Parishad (AGP) etc.

Jonai is a small town which lies on the border of Arunachal Pradesh state. It connects to the rest of the country through national highway no 52. It is also the last railway station of the Indian Railways which stretches towards the east. The name of the railway station is Murkong Selek.

People 
Jonai is mostly inhabited by the Mising people, an indigenous community inhabiting in the parts of the Indian states of Assam and Arunachal Pradesh who were of Mongoloid origin. They were also known as Miris in the past and still recognized as Miris in the Constitution of India. Miri is the older name and traces back to the ancestor Abotani. Misings are recognized as a Scheduled Tribe by the Indian government under the name 'Miri'. About 65% of inhabitant of Jonai are Mishing community and only 35% belong to other communities according to 2011 Census of India. The literacy rate of Jonai is much higher than the national level. Ali Ai Ligang is a local festival. On that day they prepare a local homemade rice beer known as "Apong", available in two varieties i.e. Nogin and Po:Ro. On the eve of Ali Ai Ligang the Mishing girls and boys dress in traditional dress. The festival is celebrated by performing dance and singing Mishing Bihu song. Other festivals like Dobur and Porag are mostly celebrated along with the state festival of the indigenous Assamese communities. Agriculture, hand loom weaving and services are the main source of earning among the people here.

Nature and tourism 
A forest reserve named Poba is situated on the banks of the river Brahmaputra near 'Tinmile Ghat' and Bogibeel Ghat from where ferry and boat services sail to Dibrugarh. Teenmile Ghat is used as a picnic spot and has view of the Brahmaputra and a part of the Himalayan Range. There are also other picnic spots surrounding Jonai, in the Arunachal Pradesh area. Tourists are accommodated at the 'Circuit House' and the local government tourist lodge. There are shops in the Jonai Bazar area, and - while night life is minimal - there are some 'watering holes' around town.

Transport

Air 
The nearest airport is at Pasighat, Arunachal Pradesh, Lilabari in North Lakhimpur and Mohanbari Airport (Dibrugarh) from where direct flights are available to and fro Guwahati and Delhi. But only a few flights are available weekly.

Rail 
Jonai is connected via the Indian Railways network. Murkongselek is the last station of the Northeast Frontier Railway Zone of the Indian Railways. It is being planned to extend it up to Pasighat (Arunachal Pradesh). After that direct trains from New Delhi would be made available.

Road 
Jonai is also connected by road, and is near the National Highway 515. The road to Jonai lies through a valley behind the Arunachal Hills. Routes are served by buses of Assam State Transport Corporation (ASTC) and other privately owned buses like Blue Hill Travels, Network Tarvels, Royal Tours & Travels and maxi cabs which runs from ISBT Guwahati and Paltan Bazar Guwahati to reach Jonai. It is connected to Arunachal Pradesh through NH 515 and Dibrugarh through Bogibeel bridge. 24 hours bus services are available in the sub division along with small sumo services.

Waterways 
Ferry and transport services are available at Bogibeel Ghat about 67 km from Jonai, Tinmile Ghat, about 8 kilometers from Jonai Bazar, and Singajan Ghat (commonly called Majorbari Ghat), about 6 kilometers from Simen Chapori. Due to lack of medical colleges and good hospitals in Dhemaji, people travel to Dibrugarh, via these river ports.

Climate

Politics
Jonai is part of Lakhimpur (Lok Sabha constituency). Sitting MP is Pradhan barua
Sitting MLA is Mr. Bhubon pegu

References

Dhemaji district